The Circus Drive-In was a fast food hamburger drive-in restaurant located in Wall Township, New Jersey that opened in 1954, and operated until 2017. Cars originally pulled up and parked around the round building, which remained until its closing as an open-air indoor seating area. There was also a partially covered drive-in aisle where cars could pull up to experience classic drive-in service.

Besides standard hamburger fare, the Circus was known for its batter-dipped onion rings, fried Maryland softshell crab, and a newer addition of New England Lobster roll.

The restaurant was featured in a sixth-season episode of The Secret Life Of... on the Food Network.

References

Further reading
 "Circus Drive-In: Still a showstopper after 60 years". The Star-Ledger.
 Food Lovers' Guide to New Jersey
 New Jersey Curiosities 
 O'New Jersey
 "Wall, N.J., Drive-In Restaurant Is Sold, Begins 50th Season on Jersey Shore". Tribune Business News.

External links

1954 establishments in New Jersey
Buildings and structures in Monmouth County, New Jersey
Drive-in restaurants
Defunct restaurants in the United States
Restaurants established in 1954
Tourist attractions in Monmouth County, New Jersey
Wall Township, New Jersey
Restaurants disestablished in 2017
2017 disestablishments in New Jersey
Buildings and structures demolished in 2018